Listrocerum bicolor is a species of beetle in the family Cerambycidae. It was described by Lepesme in 1950, originally under the genus Combesius. It is known from Ghana, Sierra Leone, the Ivory Coast, the Central African Republic, and Togo.

References

Dorcaschematini
Beetles described in 1950